The US–Pacific Island Country Summit was a meeting hosted by President of the United States Joe Biden with Pacific Island leaders held on September 28–29, 2022 at the White House in Washington, D.C., which coincided with the week of the 77th session of the United Nations General Assembly.

Background
The summit was announced by Kurt Campbell on August 6, 2022, and confirmed by United States Deputy Secretary of State Wendy Sherman who was at Tonga at the time. The United States which previously addressed the 51st Pacific Islands Forum in July 2022 announced that it will open a series of new diplomatic missions to counter China's growing presence in the Pacific region. On September 2, 2022, the White House released a statement confirming that the summit will be held from September 28 to 29, 2022.

Summit

September 28, 2022
The Pacific leaders endorsed the declaration of the United States–Pacific partnership that commits the United States and the Pacific Island countries to work together "in the face of a worsening climate crisis and an increasingly complex geopolitical environment". The partnership also includes the prospect of "big dollar" aid to the Pacific region which includes more than $860 million in expanded programs.

September 29, 2022
The summit participants released a declaration making 11 commitments

 Resolution to strengthen partnership
 Commitment to bolstering Pacific regionalism
 Commitment to tackling the climate crisis
 Commitment to enhancing cooperation to advance economic growth and sustainable development in the Pacific
 Commitment to supporting each other in preparation and response to natural disasters
 Resolution to protect the Blue Pacific and enhance the laws that govern it
 Resolution to maintain peace and security across the Pacific continent
 Commitment to continue cooperating in addressing COVID-19 and other health-related issues
 Commitment to expanding opportunities for citizens of participating countries
 Commitment to address legacies of conflict and promotion of nuclear nonproliferation
 Commitment to future implementation of the partnership

Participants
The White House invited 12 Pacific island countries including the Solomon Islands which previously signed a security agreement with China in April 2022. Twelve states sent their leaders while Nauru and Vanuatu sent representatives.

Participating countries

Observers
  Australia
  New Zealand

Attendees
 President Joseph R. Biden, Jr. of the United States of America (Host)
 Prime Minister Mark Brown of Cook Islands
 Prime Minister Josaia Voreqe Bainimarama of the Republic of Fiji
 President David W. Panuelo of the Federated States of Micronesia
 President Edouard Fritch of the Government of French Polynesia
 Charge d’Affaires Josie-Ann Dongobir of the Republic of Nauru
 President Louis Mapou of the Government of New Caledonia
 President Surangel S. Whipps, Jr. of the Republic of Palau
 Prime Minister James Marape of the Independent State of Papua New Guinea
 President David Kabua of the Republic of the Marshall Islands
 Prime Minister Fiamē Naomi Mata’afa of the Independent State of Samoa
 Prime Minister Manasseh Sogavare of Solomon Islands
 Prime Minister Siaosi ‘Ofakivahafolau Sovaleni of the Kingdom of Tonga
 Prime Minister Kausea Natano of Tuvalu
 Ambassador Odo Tevi of the Republic of Vanuatu

References

External links
 United States Department of State – U.S.-Pacific Island Country Summit

2022 conferences
2022 in international relations
2022 in Washington, D.C.
September 2022 events in the United States
Diplomatic conferences in the United States
United States–Oceanian relations
Presidency of Joe Biden
History of the White House